The Piano Trio in D minor Op. 11 by Fanny Mendelssohn was conceived between 1846 and 1847 as a birthday present for her sister,  and posthumously published in 1850, three years after the composer's death.

The trio is in four movements:

Allegro molto vivace
Andante espressivo
Lied: Allegretto
Allegretto moderato

In 1847, an anonymous critic in the Neue Berliner Musik Zeitung found in the trio “...broad, sweeping foundations that build themselves up through stormy waves into a marvelous edifice. In this respect the first movement is a masterpiece, and the trio most highly original.” Angela Mace Christian refers to the piece in Grove's as "one of her most impressive chamber works."

See also
List of compositions by Fanny Mendelssohn

References

External links

 Fanny Mendelssohn-Hensel Piano Trio in D minor - performed by the Claremont Trio.

Mendelssohn, Fanny
1850 compositions
Compositions in D minor
Compositions by Fanny Mendelssohn